Oxycentrus is a genus of beetles in the family Carabidae, containing the following species:

 Oxycentrus acutipennis N.Ito, 1996 
 Oxycentrus acutulus Bates, 1892 
 Oxycentrus angusticeps N.Ito, 2000 
 Oxycentrus argutoroides (Bates, 1873) 
 Oxycentrus assamensis Kirschenhofer, 1992 
 Oxycentrus atratus Kirschenhofer, 1992 
 Oxycentrus baehri N.Ito, 1996 
 Oxycentrus borneensis Bates, 1876 
 Oxycentrus castaneus Kirschenhofer, 1992 
 Oxycentrus changi Habu, 1978 
 Oxycentrus foveicollis Bates, 1889 
 Oxycentrus fulgens N.Ito, 1997 
 Oxycentrus giganteus N.Ito, 1996 
 Oxycentrus gracilitarsis N.Ito, 1996 
 Oxycentrus grandis (Emden, 1937) 
 Oxycentrus gusenleitneri N.Ito, 1996 
 Oxycentrus hayakawai Ito, 2006 
 Oxycentrus horni Schauberger, 1938 
 Oxycentrus iridicolor N.Ito, 1996 
 Oxycentrus ivani N.Ito, 1996 
 Oxycentrus javanus (Louwerens, 1951) 
 Oxycentrus jelineki Ito, 2006 
 Oxycentrus kraatzi (Schauberger, 1938) 
 Oxycentrus latemarginatus N.Ito, 2000 
 Oxycentrus matanganus (Schauberger, 1934) 
 Oxycentrus melas (Schmidt-Goebel, 1846) 
 Oxycentrus micros Schauberger, 1938
 Oxycentrus minor (Louwerens, 1951) 
 Oxycentrus minutopunctatus N.Ito, 1998 
 Oxycentrus miyakei Habu, 1978 
 Oxycentrus negrosensis N.Ito, 1998 
 Oxycentrus nitidus Andrewes, 1930 
 Oxycentrus oblongicollis N.Ito, 1996 
 Oxycentrus obtusicollis N.Ito, 1994 
 Oxycentrus omaseoides Bates, 1892 
 Oxycentrus orinus (Andrewes, 1931) 
 Oxycentrus parallelus Chaudoir, 1854 
 Oxycentrus parvus N.Ito, 1996 
 Oxycentrus persimilis N.Ito, 2000 
 Oxycentrus piceus (Louwerens, 1951) 
 Oxycentrus planibasis N.Ito, 1998 
 Oxycentrus punctatus N.Ito, 1996 
 Oxycentrus quadricollis N.Ito, 1994 
 Oxycentrus rectangulus N.Ito, 2000 
 Oxycentrus richterianus Kirschenhofer, 1987 
 Oxycentrus rugifrons (Louwerens, 1954) 
 Oxycentrus sakaii N.Ito, 1998 
 Oxycentrus schaubergeri N.Ito, 1996 
 Oxycentrus shibatai N.Ito, 1993 
 Oxycentrus siamensis N.Ito, 1994 
 Oxycentrus sikkimensis Kirschenhofer, 1992 
 Oxycentrus smetanai N.Ito, 1996 
 Oxycentrus striolatus Andrewes, 1930 
 Oxycentrus subarcuaticollis N.Ito, 1997 
 Oxycentrus subdepressus N.Ito, 1994 
 Oxycentrus subovatus N.Ito, 1993 
 Oxycentrus yoshidai N.Ito, 2001

References

Harpalinae